Ali Ezzine (Arabic: علي الزين ; born September 3, 1978 in Ain Taoujdate, Morocco) is a Moroccan athlete who specializes in the 3000 metres steeplechase. He won the bronze medal in this event at the 2000 Summer Olympics held in Sydney, Australia.

He first came to prominence with a bronze medal in the steeplechase at the 1996 World Junior Championships in Athletics, also held in Sydney. His first senior medal came at the 1998 IAAF World Cross Country Championships, where his twelfth-place finish helped the Moroccan men to the team silver medal.

He had his first individual global success at the World Championships in Athletics. At the 1999 World Championships he won the bronze medal in the men's steeplechase. He also won the bronze at the 1999 IAAF Grand Prix Final. Two years later, after his Olympic medal performance, he attended the 2001 World Championships and improved to the silver medal. He returned to the Olympic stage at the 2004 Athens Olympics, but he did not reach the podium on that occasion, finishing in eighth in the final.

In 1999 he achieved the fastest ever time in the steeplechase for a non-Kenyan athlete (8:03.57). This mark has since been surpassed by several other non-Kenyans.

Achievements

Personal bests
1500 metres - 3:43.8 min (1998)
3000 metres - 7:45.9 min (2004)
5000 metres - 13:32.56 min (1997)
3000 metres steeplechase - 8:03.57 min (2000)

External links
Focus on Athletes article from IAAF
 
 

1978 births
Living people
Moroccan male long-distance runners
Moroccan male steeplechase runners
Olympic athletes of Morocco
Athletes (track and field) at the 2000 Summer Olympics
Athletes (track and field) at the 2004 Summer Olympics
Olympic bronze medalists for Morocco
People from Ain Taoujdate
World Athletics Championships medalists
Medalists at the 2000 Summer Olympics
Olympic bronze medalists in athletics (track and field)